Panao is a town in central Peru, capital of Pachitea in Huánuco Region.

Populated places in the Huánuco Region